Carex infirminervia is a tussock-forming species of perennial sedge in the family Cyperaceae. It is native to western parts of North America.

See also
List of Carex species

References

infirminervia
Plants described in 2002
Flora of Alberta
Flora of British Columbia
Flora of Washington (state)
Flora of California
Flora of Colorado
Flora of Idaho
Flora of Montana
Flora of Nevada
Flora of Oregon
Flora of Wyoming